Suregada lanceolata is a species of plant in the family Euphorbiaceae. It is native to India and Sri Lanka.

Description
Leaves - alternate or oblanceolate; apex acuminate; margin entire.
Flowers - unisexual. male flowers are peduncled cymes, female flowers are solitary and axillary.
Fruits - three-seeded and three-lobed globose capsule.

References

Crotonoideae
Flora of the Indian subcontinent